Two ships in the United States Navy have been named USS Sands for Benjamin F. Sands and his son, James H. Sands.

 The second  was placed in service in 1965, struck in 1990 and sold to Brazil.

United States Navy ship names